The 2017 Monmouth Hawks football team represented Monmouth University in the 2017 NCAA Division I FCS football season as a member of the Big South Conference. They were led by 25th-year head coach Kevin Callahan and played their home games at Kessler Field in West Long Branch, New Jersey. Monmouth finished the season 9–3 overall a nd 4–1 in Big South play to place in second. The Hawks received an at-large bid to the FCS Playoffs marking the school's first playoff berth. There they lost to Northern Iowa in the first round.

Previous season 
The Hawks finished the 2016 season 4–7, 0–5 in Big South play to finish in last place.

Schedule

Game summaries

Lafayette

Lehigh

at Albany

at Hampton

at Bucknell

at Holy Cross

Liberty

at Charleston Southern

Presbyterian

Gardner–Webb

at Kennesaw State

FCS Playoffs

at Northern Iowa–First Round

Ranking movements

References

Monmouth
Monmouth Hawks football seasons
Monmouth
Monmouth Hawks football